Matthias Freihof (born 25 November 1961) is a German television actor and director. He has performed in many TV films and series including police drama Siska for 5 years. but also works on live stage performing as an actor and a singer. He is most known former the GDR-film Coming Out in 1989. He and the film won prizes in several festivals as best actor and best film as well as 'The Silver Bear' in the Berlin Film Festival 1990.

Life 
Freihof was born in Plauen on 25 November 1961. After graduating from high school and completing his three-year military service in the NVA, Freihof then studied at Ernst Busch Academy of Dramatic Arts in Berlin. He made his stage debut at the Maxim Gorki Theater in Berlin between 1983 and 1984 in The Pilot Of the Stars. He then spent two years at the Kleist Theater in Frankfurt (Oder) from 1987 to 1989. His first TV movie role was a student in Die erste Reihe in 1987.

His first DEFA film was "Käthe Kollwitz", where he played the son of Jutta Wachowiak. His second film role, at age 27, was in Coming Out, an LGBT-themed film and one of the last DEFA productions. He played Philip, a teacher realising late in life that he is gay. Freihof himself also came out as gay after the film's release. He had come out as a teenager, but wanted to come out officially and to the public (such as in interviews).

In 1989, he performed in Cabaret Intim at the Berliner Palast der Republik, and then Spass am sein in 1990. From 1992 to 1994, he went on an international tour with the musical program Leidenschaften.

Freihof has also been active as a singer. He released a song titled Tastes Your Life after Chamomile Tea (1989).

From 1996 to 1997, he played teacher Boris Magnus in the ARD series Marienhof. From 1998 to 2003, in 50 episodes, he played the role of "Assistant Lorenz Wigand" to Chief Commissioner Siska in the eponymous ZDF crime series. He had guest appearances in Mona M. – Mit den Waffen einer Frau and Alarm für Cobra 11 – Die Autobahnpolizei, both in 1996, and Der Alte in 1997.

At times he taught as a lecturer at his former drama school, the Ernst Busch and the Berlin School of Drama.

Freihof played Heinrich Himmler, the Reichsführer of the Schutzstaffel (SS) in the movie Valkyrie, about the Stauffenberg assassination (Operation Valkyrie), which reconstructed the assassination of Adolf Hitler on July 20, 1944 and starred Tom Cruise as Stauffenberg. However, his two short scenes were cut from the final theatrical version.

After leaving the TV show Siska, he has mainly worked on the stage. In 2008, he directed a play called "Ganz Kerle", which was performed in the Theater am Kurfürstendamm in Berlin. He also brought Canadian comedy "Whole Guys" by Kerry Renards to the stage. He has directed in Düsseldorf and had a starring role at Berlin's Schlosspark-Theater.

Personal life
Freihof is openly gay and is married with a husband.

Filmography

Film

TV

References

External links
 
 Official website 

1961 births
Living people
People from Plauen
People from Bezirk Karl-Marx-Stadt
East German actors
German male film actors
German male television actors
German gay actors